Walter Tarplin (30 March 1879–1937) was an English footballer who played in the Football League for Notts County.

References

1879 births
1937 deaths
English footballers
Association football forwards
English Football League players
Coventry City F.C. players
Notts County F.C. players
Reading F.C. players
Stafford Rangers F.C. players
Shrewsbury Town F.C. players